The British Gas Swimming Championships (50 m) 2014 were held at the Tollcross International Swimming Centre, Glasgow from 10–15 April 2014. They also doubled as the first trials for the 2014 Commonwealth Games. They were organised by British Swimming and sponsored by British Gas.

Medal winners

Open Men's events

Key: WR=World record; ER=European record; CR=Commonwealth record; NR=National record

Open Women's events

Key: WR=World record; ER=European record; CR=Commonwealth record; NR=National record

See also
British Swimming
List of British Swimming Championships champions
List of British records in swimming

References

2014 in swimming
2014 British Swimming Championships (50m)
2014 in British sport
April 2014 sports events in the United Kingdom